The Ecuador national football team represents Ecuador in men's international football and is controlled by the Ecuadorian Football Federation (FEF). They joined FIFA in 1926 and CONMEBOL a year later.

Discarding an invitation to participate in the inaugural FIFA World Cup held in Uruguay, Ecuador did not make their tournament debut until 2002. After finishing above Brazil and Uruguay in the standings, the qualifying campaign marked the emergence of several players, such as Agustín Delgado, Álex Aguinaga, Iván Hurtado, Ulises de la Cruz and Iván Kaviedes, who would set the stage for Ecuador's achievements in the next decade. Having reached the Round of 16 in a memorable 2006 World Cup campaign, they were expected to deliver at the 2007 Copa América but were eliminated in the group stage. Along with Venezuela, they have not won the continental tournament. La Tris best performance was fourth in 1959 and 1993, both times on home soil.

Ecuador plays the majority of their home matches at the Estadio Olímpico Atahualpa in Quito.

History
Historically, Ecuador has been seen as a struggling footballing nation in South America. Despite their past failures, however, Ecuador has risen to be a serious South American competitor in recent years.

Football was introduced to Ecuador by Juan Alfredo Wright, who had recently returned from university in England. On 23 April 1899, he and his brother Roberto founded the first Ecuadorian football team, Guayaquil Sport Club. As the popularity of the sport grew in the country, more teams were established. On 30 May 1925, the Federación Deportiva Nacional del Ecuador was founded. In 1930, FIFA sent an invitation encouraging for a men's national team to participate at the maiden World Cup. However, the then-Minister of Social Security and Sports declined the offer as they did not approve of the financial allocation.

In 1938, the I Bolivarian Games were organized, with Ecuador set to take part in the football tournament. On 8 August 1938, they played their first-ever match; a 1–1 draw with Bolivia. Their following game saw the national team earn a 2–1 win against Colombia. Following a 9–1 crushing by Peru and a 5–2 victory over Venezuela, Ecuador was tied for the silver medal with Bolivia. A playoff saw the Bolivians emerge triumphantly and the Ecuadorians finished the competition with the bronze medal.

After finishing fourth at the 1959 South American Championship, the team entered the World Cup qualifiers for the first time. They failed to qualify for 1962 finals after inflicted defeats by Argentina.

The 1998 World Cup qualifiers saw the format for qualifying in CONMEBOL changed to a league home-and-away system. This difference made a huge impact on Ecuador's performance as they clinched several important home wins during the campaign. In the end, they achieved a 6th-place finish, just under Peru and Chile.

Following the appointment of Hernán Darío Gómez for their 2002 World Cup qualifying campaign, Ecuador recorded a historic 1–0 win against Brazil. A 5–1 win over Bolivia saw la Tricolor only needing a point to qualify for the World Cup. They faced Uruguay, and, after managing to cling onto a 1–1 draw, obtained their spot in the World Cup in Japan.

Ecuador started the 2002 World Cup with a 2–0 loss to Italy. Agustín Delgado scored his country's first World Cup goal; he opened the scoring in a 2–1 loss to Mexico. Though they finished fourth in Group G and 24th overall, Ecuador defeated Croatia, who had achieved third place in the previous tournament, and eliminated the Croats in process.

A disappointing showing at the 2004 Copa América led to the resignation of Gómez, who was replaced by Luis Fernando Suárez. He led them successfully through the latter stages of the qualification process for the 2006 FIFA World Cup, finishing third to make the finals. In Germany, they were drawn into Group A with the hosts, Poland, and Costa Rica. Wins over Poland and Costa Rica earned Ecuador qualification to the knockout stages for the first time.

After a dull 2014 FIFA World Cup, and an unpleasant streak of failing to advance past the group stages of the Copa América, Gustavo Quinteros was hired to help rebuild the national team. Quinteros helped Ecuador reach the quarter-finals of the Copa América Centenario and started the 2018 World Cup qualifiers strong. They were setback after a loss to Uruguay and finished eighth in the standings.

Gómez was reinstalled to lead Ecuador at the 2019 Copa América. His second stint was short, as he was soon fired after a disastrous tournament, having only earned a point.

For the qualifying for the 2026 FIFA World Cup, as punishment for falsifying birth documents for Byron Castillo in the previous World Cup qualification cycle, Ecuador were deducted 3 points and fined CHF 100,000.

Home stadium

The Ecuador national team plays their home games at the Estadio Olímpico Atahualpa in Quito. Having opened in 1951, it initially had a capacity of 45,000, but was later reduced to 35,724.

The stadium has a running track, which has gone to be one of the most important in South America for events organized by the former International Association of Athletics Federations.

15 gates surround the stadium, allowing for an evacuation to be completed in about 10 minutes. The venue also features an electronic scoreboard located in the northern sector. The screen, manufactured by Hungarian-based company Elektroimpex in 1985, measures 10 meters tall and 30 meters wide.

In this stadium, Ecuador defeated Uruguay at the 1993 Copa América and Brazil at the 2002 World Cup qualifiers. After tying with the former on 7 November 2001, Ecuador qualified for their first World Cup. Since then, Ecuador has qualified three times.

The stadium is set to be demolished in late-2020 for a newer stadium in preparation for the 2024 Copa América. For the 2022 FIFA World Cup qualifiers, Ecuador will play at the Casa Blanca.

Team image

The standard Ecuador uniform maintains the colours of the national flag, typically a yellow top, blue shorts, and red socks. The alternate colours of the uniform are white and blue, this being based on the flag of the Guayas Province. From 1965 to 2020, the crest featured the Andean condor, Ecuador's national bird, above a shield with the country's colors. In January 2020, the Ecuadorian Football Federation announced a rebrand of the logo; a navy blue shield with an "FEF" monogram attempting to "abstractly build a condor".

Kit sponsorship

Results and fixtures

The following is a list of match results from the previous 12 months, as well as any future matches that have been scheduled.

2022

2023

Coaching staff

Coaching history

 Enrique Lamas (1938)
 Ramón Unamuno (1939)
 Juan Parodi (1941–1942)
 Rodolfo Orlandini (1945)
 Ramón Unamuno (1947)
 José Planas Artés (1949)
 Iván Esperón (1953)
 José María Díaz (1955)
 Eduardo Spandre (1957)
 Juan López (1959–1960)
 Fausto Montalván (1963, 1966)
 José María Rodríguez (1965)
 José Gomes Nogueira (1969)
 Ernesto Guerra (1970, 1977–1979, 1983)
 Jorge Lazo (1972)
 Roberto Resquín (1973)
 Roque Máspoli (1975–1977)
 Héctor Morales (1979–1980)
 Otto Vieira (1981)
 Juan Hohberg (1981–1982)
 Antonio Ferreira (1984–1985)
 Luis Grimaldi (1986–1987)
 Dušan Drašković (1988–1993)
 Carlos Torres Garcés (1994)
 Carlos Ron (1994)
 Francisco Maturana (1995–1997, 1997)
 Luis Fernando Suárez (1997, 2004–2007)
 Polo Carrera (1998)
 Carlos Sevilla (1999)
 Hernán Darío Gómez (1999–2004, 2018–2019)
 Sixto Vizuete (2007–2010, 2014–2015)
 Reinaldo Rueda (2010–2014)
  Gustavo Quinteros (2015–2017)
 Jorge Célico (2017–2018, 2019–2020)
 Jordi Cruyff (2020)
 Gustavo Alfaro (2020–2023)
 Félix Sánchez (2023–)

Players

Current squad
The following players were called up for the friendly matches against Australia on 24 and 28 March 2023.

Caps and goals correct as of 29 November 2022, after the match against .

Recent call-ups
The following players have been called up during the last twelve months.

INJ Withdrew from the squad due to injury.
PRE Preliminary squad / standby.
RET Retired from the national team.
SUS  Withdrew from the squad due to suspension.

Retired numbers
Following the death of Christian Benítez, the Ecuadorian Football Federation retired his jersey number 11 from the national team.  According to the Federation's then-president, Luis Chiriboga, to honor Benítez the number would no longer be used by any other team player.  However, due to FIFA regulations, the number had to be reinstated for the 2014 World Cup squad.

Player records

Players in bold are still active with Ecuador.

Most appearances

Most goals

Competitive record

FIFA World Cup

Copa América

 Champions   Runners-up   Third place   Fourth place

Pan American Games

Head-to-head record
Below is a result summary of all matches Ecuador have played against FIFA recognized teams.

Honours
Despite never having won a title with their senior team, Ecuador has two relevant achievements with their youth teams.

Senior team

Friendlies
 Canada Cup:
 Winners: 1999

See also

 Ecuador national under-23 football team
 Ecuador national under-20 football team
 Ecuador national under-17 football team
 Ecuador national futsal team

References

External links

 Official website 
 futbolecuador.com 
 Ecuador FIFA profile

 
South American national association football teams